Richard Nedomlel (born July 1, 1993) is a Czech professional ice hockey defenceman for Mountfield HK of the Czech Extraliga (ELH). Nedomlel was drafted 175th overall by the Detroit Red Wings in the 2011 NHL Entry Draft.

Playing career

Junior
Nedomlel was drafted 31st overall by the Swift Current Broncos in the 2010 CHL Import Draft. During the 2010–11 season, he recorded 10 assists in 66 games for the Broncos. During the 2011–12 season, he recorded 10 goals and 36 assists in 72 games. He was one of only two players to play in all 72 games. During the 2012–13 season, he was the second-leading scorer among Swift Current defenceman, recording seven goals and 21 assists in 72 games. During the playoffs he recorded one assist in five games.

Professional
On April 5, 2013, the Detroit Red Wings signed Nedomlel to a three-year, entry-level contract. During the 2013–14 season, in his first professional season, Nedomlel spent most of the season with the Toledo Walleye of the ECHL, where he recorded eight goals and 10 assists in 60 games. He also appeared in three games for the Grand Rapids Griffins of the American Hockey League (AHL).

During the 2014–15 season, Nedomlel recorded three goals and 11 assists in 49 games for the Walleye. The Walleye finished first in the Eastern Conference and won the Brabham Cup. During the 2015 Kelly Cup playoffs, he recorded two assists in 12 games, helping the Walleye reach the conference finals. Nedomlel began the 2015–16 season with the Griffins where he appeared in two games, accounting for a plus-one rating and 20 penalty minutes. He also appeared in 10 games for the Walleye, where he recorded two assists.

On January 15, 2016, the Red Wings traded Nedomlel to the St. Louis Blues in exchange for future considerations. He was reassigned to the Chicago Wolves, where he recorded two assists in 12 games. On March 16, 2016, he was assigned to the Quad City Mallards, where he played in nine games.

During the 2016–17 season, Nedomlel returned to his hometown of Prague and joined HC Sparta Praha of the Czech Extraliga (ELH), where he recorded four assists in 41 games.

Career statistics

References

External links
 

1993 births
Living people
BK Mladá Boleslav players
Chicago Wolves players
Czech ice hockey defencemen
Detroit Red Wings draft picks
Grand Rapids Griffins players
Stadion Hradec Králové players
Quad City Mallards (ECHL) players
HC Sparta Praha players
Ice hockey people from Prague
Swift Current Broncos players
Toledo Walleye players
Czech expatriate ice hockey players in Canada
Czech expatriate ice hockey players in the United States